Luby's, Inc. (formerly Luby's Cafeterias, Inc.) is a parent company that operates the Luby's chain of cafeteria-style restaurants. In the past, Luby's Inc. also owned the Fuddruckers, Koo Koo Roo, and Cheeseburger in Paradise restaurant chains.

As of March 2023 there are 42 locations in Texas. Its headquarters is in the Near Northwest district of Houston, Texas.  The original location was founded in 1947 in San Antonio, Texas by Robert Luby (1910–1998).

Luby's Culinary Services provides contract food service management to eighteen healthcare, higher education, and corporate dining locations, such as Texas Children's Hospital, Lone Star College, and formerly, Baylor College of Medicine, which ended its relationship with Luby's in March 2015.

History

Bob Luby was one year old when his father, Harry, opened his first cafeteria called the New England Dairy Lunch. Bob opened his first Luby's Cafeteria in 1947, focusing on fresh food and customer service. Luby's soon expanded outside of San Antonio to Tyler, Harlingen, El Paso, and Beaumont.

In 1959, the original partners formed Cafeterias, Inc. Luby's continued to expand, entering other Texas cities and locations in contiguous states. Luby's entered Houston for the first time when it opened Romana Cafeteria in 1965. Locations opened in New Mexico in 1966 and in Oklahoma in 1980.

In 1973, Cafeterias, Inc., became a publicly traded company. To honor Bob Luby, Cafeterias, Inc., was renamed Luby's Cafeterias, Inc., in 1981. One year later, Luby's shares were listed on the New York Stock Exchange. By 1987 Luby's had reached 100 locations. The company operated in 11 states in 1996, having over 200 restaurants at that time.

In 2001, Chris and Harris Pappas of Houston's Pappas Restaurants (owners of Pappasito's Cantina, Pappadeaux Seafood Kitchen, etc.) joined the Luby's management team. Three years later, Luby's moved its corporate headquarters from San Antonio to Houston. The addition of the Pappas management team saw several Luby's restaurants begin to transition from traditional cafeteria-style establishments to hybrid cafeteria/fine dining.

Luby's celebrated its 60th anniversary in December 2006 with publishing “Luby’s Recipes & Memories: A Collection of our Favorite Dishes and Heartwarming Stories". In 2008, Luby's published a special edition of the cookbook that included 12 additional recipes.

In 2009, due to the economic recession, Luby's closed 25 stores and laid off staff as a cost-cutting measure.

In 2010 Luby's Culinary Services introduced "What's Brewing?", a coffeehouse concept store in Downtown Houston.

The same year, on June 18, Luby's announced it was buying Fuddruckers and Koo Koo Roo for $61 million after parent company Magic Brands LLC went bankrupt. On June 13, 2011, Luby's opened its first company-owned Fuddruckers restaurant in downtown Houston's seven-mile (11 km) tunnel system.

In 2013, Luby's acquired Cheeseburger in Paradise.

There were 93 Luby's in August 2015, and this declined to 78 in 2019. Technomic consumer insights senior manager Robert Byrne stated that the fast casual restaurants reduced Luby's market share.

During the 2020 COVID-19 lockdowns, Luby's Inc furloughed more than half of its corporate staff and cut the pay of remaining salaried employees by 50 percent. Luby's Inc also applied for and received a loan of US$10 million as part of the Paycheck Protection Program.

Sale of Fuddruckers and acquisition by Calvin Gin
On June 3, 2020, Luby's Board of Directors announced plans to sell all its operating divisions and assets, including real estate assets. This decision was influenced in part by circumstances surrounding the COVID-19 pandemic. Net proceeds from transactions will benefit Luby's stockholders. The company did not have a definitive timeline for future transactions, but expected to eventually wind down remaining operations.

On September 8, 2020, Luby's further announced it has adopted a plan to liquidate all of its existing assets, as opposed to operating in the current form or merely selling off divisions.

As of September 11, 2020, there were 80 Luby's and Fuddruckers still in operation.

99% of Luby's stockholders voted for dissolution in November 2020.

On June 21, 2021, Calvin Gin, founder of Flying Food Group, agreed to buy 32 Luby's locations for $28.7 million, a week after Nicholas Perkins of North Carolina agreed to buy Luby's Fuddruckers brand for $18.5 million. Prior to the announcement of Gin's acquisition, Luby's had planned to close all locations by August 2021.

Headquarters
Luby's has its headquarters in Suite 600 of the 13111 Northwest Freeway building in the Near Northwest district and in Houston, Texas.

In July 2004, Luby's announced that it would move its headquarters from San Antonio to Houston, where Pappas Restaurants has its headquarters. At that time Luby's did not yet state to where it would be moving; the company stated that it would most likely move to a suburb in Greater Houston. 80 jobs were transferred to Houston.

In media
The "Lu Ann Platter", a popular combination platter served at Luby's, is a half portion main dish with vegetables.  This plate was the inspiration for the character name Luanne Platter from the animated Texas comedy/drama, King of the Hill. The cafeteria itself is characterized as "Luly's" on the show.

References
Notes

External links

Luby's website
Pappas Restaurants website
Fuddruckers Website
 Business data for Luby's: Yahoo Finance | MarketWatch | WSJ |SEC Filings

Companies listed on the New York Stock Exchange
Restaurants established in 1947
Regional restaurant chains in the United States
Companies based in Houston
Restaurants in Texas
Restaurants in San Antonio
Restaurants in Houston
Cafeteria-style restaurants
1947 establishments in Texas